Spotlight on Nilsson is the debut album by Harry Nilsson. It is essentially a compilation of all four of the singles (and their respective B-Sides) that were released during his tenure on the Tower label (1964–1966), plus two previously unreleased tracks. It has been re-issued numerous times over the years with different sleeves, attempting to capitalize on his later success at RCA. It was released in 1969 on 8-track on Pickwick as Rock 'N' Roll, without "The Path That Leads to Trouble", and in the UK on EMI's One-Up label in 1972 as Early Years, with the original tracklisting.

The track "Good Times" would be later covered by the Monkees as the title track for their 2016 reunion album.

Track listing
All tracks composed by Harry Nilsson; except where indicated
"The Path That Leads to Trouble" (Johnny Cole) – 2:08 - with The New Salvation Singers
"Good Times" – 1:50 - with The New Salvation Singers
"So You Think You've Got Troubles" (Marvin Rainwater) – 2:20
"I'm Gonna Lose My Mind" (Johnny Cole) – 2:06
"She's Yours" (Nilsson, J.R. Shanklin) – 2:02
"Sixteen Tons" (Merle Travis) – 2:29
"Born in Grenada" (Nilsson, John Marascalco) – 2:16
"You Can't Take Your Love (Away from Me)" – 2:20
"Growin' Up" – 2:48
"Do You Believe" – 2:20

References

Harry Nilsson albums
1966 debut albums
Albums arranged by George Tipton
Tower Records albums